The Confucian court examination system in Vietnam (Chữ Nôm: 制度科舉越南, Vietnamese : Chế độ khoa cử Việt Nam) was a system for entry into the civil service modeled on the Imperial examination in China, based on knowledge of the classics and literary style from 1075 to 1919.



History
 
The exams entered Vietnam during the long era of Chinese occupation and adopted by subsequent independent dynasties as a way of filling the civil service. They were instituted at court level by the Lý dynasty's Emperor Lý Nhân Tông in 1075 and continued some 1000 years later toward the final years of the Nguyễn dynasty's Emperor Khải Định. The examinations were suspended by the French in 1913 with the very last local exams occurring from 1915 to 1919, thus making Vietnam the last country to hold Confucian civil service examinations. The royal court exams were typically held every three years, though the award of first prizes was far less frequent.

Exam procedures

The examination system was divided into a regional and a national examination held at the royal capital. Provincial examinations led only to the degree of tú tài (秀才 junior bachelor) and cử nhân (舉人 senior bachelor). From 1829 a provincial mandarin could progress to phó bảng (副榜), the lowest level of national exam, under the scholars with the rank of tiến sĩ (doctorate).

The examinations themselves were composed of three or four tests, followed by a phúc hạch (覆核) or control examination to confirm identity.

Aside from accrediting rank and file scholars to the court and mandarin civil service positions gleaned from the successful regional candidates, the exams also appointed lead scholars for the court exam (Thi Đình) in the capital, the title of trạng nguyên. 
This title was first awarded to Lê Văn Thịnh (d.1096). Subsequent exams starting in 1247 and onward were divided into three first class grades along the Chinese model with trạng nguyên as the first of three prizes. The first trạng nguyên under this system was Nguyễn Hiền. The full list of trạng nguyên therefore includes 55 scholars if beginning from Lê Văn Thịnh, but only 49 if commencing from Nguyễn Hiền (awarded 1247, in the reign of Trần Thái Tông).

The three titles were as follows :
 Trạng nguyên (狀元) – first place, reserved for the best scholar
 Bảng nhãn (榜眼) – second place
 Thám hoa (探花) – third place
 Tiến sĩ (進士) – all the other successful applicants
The list of trạng nguyên includes several notable figures in Vietnam's history, such as Mạc Đĩnh Chi (awarded 1304, in the reign of Trần Anh Tông) and Nguyễn Bỉnh Khiêm (awarded 1535, in the reign of Mạc Thái Tông). The last trạng nguyên was awarded to Trịnh Tuệ in 1736 during the reign of Lê Ý Tông.

References

Confucianism in Vietnam
Imperial examination